Jaan Põdra (29 May 1894 Kabala Parish, Viljandi County – 4 February 1942 Vyatka prison camp, Kirov Oblast) was an Estonian politician. He was a member of VI Riigikogu (its Chamber of Deputies).

Following the Soviet occupation of Estonia in 1940, Põdra was arrested by the NKVD on 28 January 1941. On 12 December 1941, he was sentenced to death. The sentence was carried out by gunshot at Vyatka prison camp in  Kirov Oblast, Russian Soviet Federative Socialist Republic on 4 February 1942.

References

1894 births
1942 deaths
Members of the Riigivolikogu
Estonian people executed by the Soviet Union
People who died in the Gulag
People from Türi Parish